Sandalabad (also Romanized as Sandalābād) is a village in Aladagh Rural District, in the Central District of Bojnord County, North Khorasan Province, Iran. At the 2006 census, its population was 1,839, in 409 families.

References 

Populated places in Bojnord County